Sirkka Selja (20 March 1920 – 17 August 2017) was a Finnish poet and writer. She was born in Hämeenkoski, Finland. Her real name was Sirkka-Liisa Tulonen.

Career
Her first book was published in 1942 titled Still I Live. In addition to poems, her production includes a play and two listening works. Selja was awarded with the State Literature Prize of Finland in 1958, the Pro Finlandia in 1970, the Aleksis Kivi Prize in  1987 and the P. Mustapää Prize in 2007. She died on 17 August 2017 in Hollola, Finland at the age of 97.

Works
 Vielä minä elän (1942)
 Vedenneito (1944)
 Taman lauluja (1945)
 Linnut (1948)
 Niin kuin ovi (1953)
 Enkelin pelto (1957)
 Juuret (1962)
 Vierailulla ketun talossa (1966)
 Runot (1970)
 Kissansilmät (1971)
 Talo nimeltä Villiruusu (1975)
 Pisaroita iholla (1978)
 Unitie (1985)
 Aurinko on tallella: valitut runot 1942–1985 (1988)
 Valokuvaaja: proosarunoja (1995)
 Puut herättävät muistini (2000)
 Mahdottomuuden ylistys (2005)
 Riikinkukon lapsi (2010)

References

External links

 Biography. (Subscription required.) 

1920 births
2017 deaths
Finnish women poets
People from Hämeenkoski
20th-century Finnish poets
21st-century Finnish poets
Pro Finlandia Medals of the Order of the Lion of Finland
21st-century Finnish women writers
20th-century Finnish women writers